Return Engagement is an album by the progressive bluegrass band Country Gentlemen, released in 1988.

Track listing

 A Miner's Life 2:56
 Lonely Child 3:10
 Ain't It Funny 2:31
 You Were Only Foolin' 2:35
 Midnight Moon 2:59
 A Tree That Stands Alone 3:04
 Don't Stop Being You 3:29
 Lonesome Highway 3:09
 Burglar Man 1:50
 I'd Like to Come Back as a Song 2:53

Personnel
 Charlie Waller - guitar, vocals
 Bill Yates - bass, vocals
 Norman Wright - mandolin, vocals
 Keith Little - banjo, vocals

with

 Glen Duncan - fiddle
 Steve Wilson - dobro

for "Burglar Man"

 Charlie Waller - guitar, vocals
 Jerry Douglas - dobro
 Norman Wright - mandolin
 James Bailey - banjo
 Mark Schatz - bass

References

1988 albums
Rebel Records albums
The Country Gentlemen albums